= Delpazolid =

Legal status
- Legal status: Investigational

Identifiers
- IUPAC name: (5R)-3-[3-fluoro-4-(1-methyl-5,6-dihydro-1,2,4-triazin-4-yl)phenyl]-5-(hydroxymethyl)-1,3-oxazolidin-2-one
- CAS Number: 1219707-39-7
- PubChem CID: 44205191
- UNII: 43EP6XV33E

Chemical and physical data
- Formula: C_{14}H_{17}FN_{4}O_{3}
- Molar mass: 308.313 g·mol^{−1}
- 3D model (JSmol): Interactive image
- SMILES: CN1CCN(C=N1)C2=C(C=C(C=C2)N3C[C@@H](OC3=O)CO)F
- InChI: InChI=1S/C14H17FN4O3/c1-17-4-5-18(9-16-17)13-3-2-10(6-12(13)15)19-7-11(8-20)22-14(19)21/h2-3,6,9,11,20H,4-5,7-8H2,1H3/t11-/m1/s1; Key:QLUWQAFDTNAYPN-LLVKDONJSA-N

Delpazolid (LCB01-0371) is an experimental antibiotic drug for the treatment of tuberculosis.
